Fábio Gamberini (born 22 September 1992) is a Brazilian racing driver currently competing in the European F3 Open Championship. He drives for the leading team in the series, British-based Team West-Tec F3 and has been widely lauded for his superb performances in the older Copa-class car in 2011.

Racing record

Career summary

References

External links

1992 births
Living people
Formula Ford drivers
British Formula Renault 2.0 drivers
Euroformula Open Championship drivers
FIA Formula Two Championship drivers
Brazilian GP3 Series drivers
Fluid Motorsport Development drivers
Mark Burdett Motorsport drivers
Team West-Tec drivers
CRS Racing drivers